Khadija El Bidaouia (1953 – 15 October 2022) was a Moroccan singer.

El Bidaouia was born in Ben Mskin Sbata, Casablanca in 1953. She was a pioneer in Aita, an ancestral Moroccan music genre which has a feminist dimension. Khadija took over during her career a male-dominated industry of mostly sheikhs, and became a favorite singer. She was beloved by several Aita sheikhs and became very popular. She released multiple albums and singles, including 'La Yensani', 'Ghzali' and 'Besmlah'.

El Bidaouia died in the military hospital in Rabat from an illness on 15 October 2022, aged 69.

References

1953 births
2022 deaths
20th-century Moroccan women singers
21st-century Moroccan women singers
People from Casablanca